The Belgrade Faculty of Medicine (/Medicinski fakultet Univerziteta u Beogradu) is a constituent institution of the University of Belgrade, which offers a wide range of academic courses in Serbian and English, including specialist practice within a network of hospitals, institutes and medical clinics. The School of Medicine includes 40 departments with over 200 professorships.

History

This school was established in 1920, when the first lecture was held by the anatomy professor Niko Miljanić. Since then, over 30000 have students graduated from this institution, including circa 850 international students. The studies last 12 semesters and are organized within the integral curriculum (no departments and study groups). The training is conducted at the faculty's institutes (basic subjects) and teaching bases of the faculty (clinical subjects).

English degree programs
The Belgrade Medical School offers a six-year program leading to an MD degree (Doctor of Medicine) for international students. The language of instruction is English and the curriculum corresponds to the same one as the Serbian students use. The studies are conducted within the school premises as well as teaching facilities in Belgrade, such as the University Hospital Center or Institute of Mental Health.

Notable alumni
Some of the school's famous students include: Svetlana Broz, Bujar Bukoshi, Živojin Bumbaširević, Bogdan Đuričić, Slavica Đukić Dejanović, Oliver Dulić, Vladeta Jerotić, Vladimir S. Kostić, Nebojša Krstić, Zlatibor Lončar, Tomica Milosavljević, Miomir Mugoša, Okwesilieze Nwodo, Slobodan Obradov, Miodrag Pavlović, Milan N. Popović, Zoran Radojičić, Ljubisav Rakić, Pasko Rakic, Ali Shukriu, Nevenka Tadić, Miodrag Radulovacki, Aleksandar Ljubić, Slobodan Uzelac and Sinisa Stanisavljevic.

See also
 Clinical Centre of Serbia

References

External links
 
 English degree programs 

University of Belgrade schools
University of Belgrade
Education in Belgrade
Medical schools in Serbia
Savski Venac